Gemmrigheim is municipality in the district of Ludwigsburg, in Baden-Württemberg, Germany.

History
The Reichenbach Priory, of Hirsau Abbey was established at Gemmrigheim around 1100.

Geography
The municipality (Gemeinde) of Gemmrigheim is located at the northern edge of the district of Ludwigsburg, in the German state of Baden-Württemberg, along the border with the district of Heilbronn. Elevation above sea level in the municipal area ranges from a high of  Normalnull (NN) to a low of  NN.

Politics
Gemmrigheim has one borough (Ortsteile), Gemmrigheim, and five villages: Heinzenberg, Liebensteiner Weg, Pumpwerk, Vogelsang, and Wasen.

Coat of arms
Gemmrigheim's coat of arms displays a green grapevine with five clusters of blue grapes growing on a black pole stuck into a green, three-pointed hill, upon a field of white. Local heraldry and seals have made reference to the practice of viticulture since 1525, usually with five clumps of grapes. This coat of arms was devised in 1924 and was accompanied by a municipal flag issued by the Ludwigsburg district office on 20 February 1980.

Transportation
Gemmrigheim is connected to Germany's network of roadways by its local Landesstraßen and Kreisstraßen. Local public transportation is provided by the Verband Region Stuttgart.

References

External links

  (in German)

Ludwigsburg (district)
Populated places on the Neckar basin
Populated riverside places in Germany
Württemberg